Lorenzo Rico (born 17 January 1962) is a Spanish handball player. He competed at the 1984 Summer Olympics, the 1988 Summer Olympics and the 1992 Summer Olympics.

References

External links
 

1962 births
Living people
Spanish male handball players
Olympic handball players of Spain
Handball players at the 1984 Summer Olympics
Handball players at the 1988 Summer Olympics
Handball players at the 1992 Summer Olympics
Sportspeople from Madrid
Handball players from the Community of Madrid